George Karageorgevich ( / Đorđe Karađorđević) may refer to:

 
 George, Crown Prince of Serbia (1887–1972)
 , son of Prince Tomislav of Yugoslavia